Wilbrod Peter Slaa is a Tanzanian Politician, Diplomat and President of the Board of CCBRT Tanzania. He is a former Member of Parliament for Karatu constituency from 1995 to 2010.

References

1948 births
Living people
Chadema MPs
Tanzanian civil servants